Waterbodies in Schleswig-Holstein

Lakes, ponds and reservoirs

A 
Achtersee

B 

Barkauer See
Behlendorfer See
Behler See
Belauer See
Benzer Seen
Bistensee
Borgdorfer See
Blankensee (Lübeck)
Bornhöveder See
Bornhöveder Seenkette
Bothkamper See
Brahmsee
Brautsee
Bültsee

D 

Dassower See
Dieksee
Dobersdorfer See
Drüsensee

E 
Einfelder See
Großer Eutiner See
Kleiner Eutiner See

F 

Flemhuder See
Fresensee
Fuhlensee

G 
Garrensee
Glinder Mühlenteich
Goossee
Grabauer See
Großer Binnensee
Großensee
Gudower See

H 
Haddebyer Noor
Hegesee
Hemmelsdorfer See
Höftsee

I 

Itzstedter See

K 
Kellersee
Kieler Bootshafen
Kirchsee
Kleiner Kiel
Klenzauer See
Kohlborn
Krebssee (Mölln)
Kronsee
Krebssee
Krummsee (Kreis Ostholstein)
Kudensee
Kührener Teich

L 
Langensee
Langsee
Lanker See
Lanzer See
Lüttauer See
Lottsee

M 

Mechower See
Middelburger See
Middelburg Lakes
Molfsee (lake)
Möllner Seenplatte
Mözener See
Mühlenteich (Lübeck)
Mühlenteich (Reinbek)

N 
Neukirchener See
Neversdorfer See

Ö 
Överdiek

P 

Passader See
Peper See
Pipersee
Großer Plöner See
Kleiner Plöner See
Plußsee
Pohlsee
Pohnsdorfer Stauung
Großer Pönitzer See
Kleiner Pönitzer See
Postsee
Pinnsee

R 

Rammsee
Rantzauer See
Ratzeburger See
Redingsdorfer See
Rosensee
Vorderer Russee

S 
Salemer See
Sarnekower See
Schaalsee
Scharsee
Schieren See
Schmalensee
Schulensee
Schulsee
Schwanensee
Schwartauer See
Schwarzsee (Mölln)
Schwonausee
Großer Segeberger See
Seedorfer See
Seekamper See
Selenter See
Sibbersdorfer See
Stadtsee (Mölln)
Stolper See
Süseler See

T 
Taschensee
Tonteich
Trammer See
Trenter See
Treßsee
Tröndelsee

U 
Ukleisee

V 
Vierer See

W 

Wardersee bei Bad Segeberg
Wardersee (Kreis Rendsburg-Eckernförde)
Wellsee
Westensee
Wielener See
Windebyer Noor
Wittensee

Rivers and streams 
See list of rivers of Schleswig-Holstein

Canals 
Alster-Beste Canal
Breitenburg Canal
Düker Canal
Eider Canal
Elbe-Lübeck Canal
Gieselau Canal
Kiel Canal
Schaalsee Canal
Stecknitz Canal

Coastal waters

Baltic Sea 
Bay of Kiel
Flensburg Fjord
Bay of Geltingen
Eckernförde Bay
Schlei
Kiel Fjord
Fehmarnsund
Fehmarn Belt
Bay of Mecklenburg
Bay of Lübeck
Bay of Neustadt

North Sea 
Helgoland Bight
Lister Tief
Hörnum Tief
Vortrapptief
Heverstrom
Mittelhever
Norderhever
Süderhever
Norder Aue
Süder Aue
Rütergat
Schmaltief
Purrenstrom
Wesselburener Loch
Bay of Meldorf
Piep

See also 
List of lakes in Schleswig-Holstein

Bodies of water of Schleswig-Holstein